Can Cladders is a studio album by London-based musical project The High Llamas. It was released in 2007 on Drag City.

Production
The High Llamas spent three years working on the album.

Critical reception
The Guardian wrote that "packed with vividly coloured melodies, these songs have a luminous quality, but they also confuse the hypnotic with the repetitive, and richness of texture with gluttonous excess." Exclaim! wrote that "the vibe throughout Can Cladders is too dreamily lethargic to sustain prolonged interest." The Cleveland Scene wrote that the album "bubbles with a bossa-nova pulse, where cascading strings sidle up to a late-night beachside piano bar."

Track listing
"The Old Spring Town" – 3:29
"Winter's Day" – 4:48
"Sailing Bells" – 3:03
"Boing Backwards" – 0:44
"Honeytrop" – 3:40
"Bacaroo" – 3:23
"Can Cladders" – 3:26
"Something About Paper" – 0:38
"Clarion Union Hall" – 4:32
"Cove Cutter" – 4:13
"Dorothy Ashby" – 3:03
"Rollin'" – 3:52
"Summer Seen" – 0:51

References

2007 albums
The High Llamas albums